Pas Bijar Gafsheh (also Romanized as Pas Bījār Gafsheh) is a village in Gafsheh-ye Lasht-e Nesha Rural District, Lasht-e Nesha District, Rasht County, Gilan Province, Iran. At the 2006 census, its population was 374, in 118 families.

References 

Populated places in Rasht County